The 2008 United Nations Security Council election was held on 17 October 2008 during the 63rd session of the United Nations General Assembly, held at United Nations Headquarters in New York City. The elections were held for five non-permanent seats on the UN Security Council for two-year mandates commencing on 1 January 2009.

In accordance with the Security Council's rotation rules, the ten non-permanent Security Council seats rotate among the regional blocs into which UN member states traditionally divide themselves for voting and representation purposes.  All five contests were won on the first ballot.  The five available seats were allocated as follows:

One for Africa, held by South Africa
One for Asia, held by Indonesia.
One for Latin America and the Caribbean, held by Panama.
Two for the Western European and Others Group, held by Belgium and Italy.

The newly elected five member states served on the Security Council for the 2009–10 period.

Elected members
The five elected members after the 2008 elections are:
Uganda for Africa, replacing South Africa.
Japan for Asia, replacing Indonesia.
Mexico for Latin America and the Caribbean, replacing Panama.
Turkey for the Western European and Others Group, replacing Belgium.
Austria for the Western European and Others Group, replacing Italy.

Both Mexico and Uganda ran unopposed for their seats within their regional groups, while Japan faced competition in the Asian region from Iran, and Austria and Turkey in the Western European and Others region had opposition from Iceland.

The election of Japan as a member of the Security Council marks the nation's tenth time there, the longest tenure up until then of any nation excluding its permanent members.

Detailed results
Both Iceland and Iran were contending for spots on the Council. Iceland was considered an unlikely choice for the Western European and Others Group, and its recent financial crisis further hurt its chances.

Iran lost the Asia seat to Japan.  Japan is the second-largest financial contributor to the UN and is thought by many to be a candidate for a permanent Security Council seat. Iran, by contrast, has had Security Council sanctions imposed on it for its nuclear program.

Voting was by secret ballot.  The official UN results showed:
192 ballot papers were distributed in each election.
For the two African and Asian seats the votes were: Uganda 181; Japan 158; Iran 32; Madagascar (not a candidate) 2; with one abstention. 
For the one Latin American and Caribbean seat the votes were: Mexico 185; Brazil (not a candidate) 1; and six countries abstaining.
For the two Western European and Other seats the votes were: Turkey 151; Austria 133; Iceland 87; Australia (not a candidate) 1; with no abstentions.
Since the winners each received more than two-thirds of the non-abstaining votes, there were no further rounds of voting.

See also

List of members of the United Nations Security Council
Japan and the United Nations
Mexico and the United Nations
European Union and the United Nations

References

External links
United Nations document GA/10768 press release
UN News Centre

External links
 Official information homepage of the candidature of the Republic of Turkey
 Official information homepage of the candidature of Iceland

2008 in international relations
2008
2008 elections
Non-partisan elections
October 2008 events